Beginning in 1966 the Newspaper Enterprise Association (NEA) annually awarded the George Halas Trophy to the most outstanding defensive player in the National Football League (NFL). The winner was released via the NEA news service and also appeared in the World Almanac, which was an NEA publication. The award ran through 1998. It was considered one of the major awards and was included in the NFL Record and Fact Book and its winners appeared in the encyclopedia, Total Football II.

Winners 
1966—             Larry Wilson, S, St. Louis Cardinals
1967— 		Deacon Jones, DE, Los Angeles Rams
1968— 		Deacon Jones, DE, Los Angeles Rams
1969— 		Dick Butkus, MLB, Chicago Bears
1970— 		Dick Butkus, MLB, Chicago Bears
1971— 		Carl Eller, DE, Minnesota Vikings
1972— 		Joe Greene, DT, Pittsburgh Steelers
1973—  	        Alan Page, DT, Minnesota Vikings
1974— 		Joe Greene, DT, Pittsburgh Steelers
1975— 		Curley Culp, DT, Houston Oilers
1976— 		Jerry Sherk, DT, Cleveland Browns
1977— 		Harvey Martin, DE, Dallas Cowboys
1978— 		Randy Gradishar, ILB, Denver Broncos
1979— 		Lee Roy Selmon, DE, Tampa Bay Buccaneers
1980— 		Lester Hayes, CB, Oakland Raiders
1981— 		Joe Klecko, DE, New York Jets
1982— 		Mark Gastineau, DE, New York Jets
1983— 		Jack Lambert, MLB, Pittsburgh Steelers
1984— 		Mike Haynes, CB, Los Angeles Raiders
1985— 		Howie Long, DE, Los Angeles Raiders/
		        Andre Tippett, OLB, New England Patriots (tie)
1986— 		Lawrence Taylor, OLB, New York Giants
1987— 		Reggie White, DE, Philadelphia Eagles
1988— 		Mike Singletary, MLB, Chicago Bears
1989— 		Tim Harris, OLB, Green Bay Packers
1990— 		Bruce Smith, DE, Buffalo Bills
1991— 	        Pat Swilling, OLB, New Orleans Saints
1992— 		Junior Seau, LB, San Diego Chargers
1993— 		Bruce Smith, DE, Buffalo Bills
1994— 		Deion Sanders, CB, San Francisco 49ers
1995— 		Bryce Paup, OLB, Buffalo Bills
1996— 		Kevin Greene, LB, Carolina Panthers
1997— 		Dana Stubblefield, DT, San Francisco 49ers
1998— 		Reggie White, DE, Green Bay Packers

Source:

See also
Newspaper Enterprise Association#NFL awards

References

National Football League trophies and awards
American football mass media